"Look What You're Doing to Me" is a song by American singer and songwriter Banks from her third studio album, III (2019). It was released as the album's second single on June 11, 2019, and features American pop project Francis and the Lights. It premiered as Annie Mac's "Hottest Record" on the same date. Banks and Brandon Treyshun Campbell co-wrote the song with its producers, BJ Burton and Francis Farewell Starlite.

Background
About "Look What You're Doing to Me", Banks stated that "the song is about love. About falling in love, being in love and how you feel when you’re high on love. Vibrant, scared, on fire, excited, and all the goodness in between".

Music video
Banks posted a lyric video for the song on her YouTube channel on June 11, 2019.

Credits and personnel
Credits adapted from the liner notes of III.

Recording and management
 Engineered at Conway Recording Studios and Henson Recording Studios, Los Angeles, California
 Mixed at Conway Recording Studios, Los Angeles, California, and Electric Lady Studios, New York City, New York
 Mastered at HM Mastering, Minneapolis, Minnesota
 Published by Chilleth Banks Publishing, administered by Songs of Kobalt Music Publishing (BMI) and brought to you by Heavy Duty (ASCAP) / Heavy Duty Music Publishing, Good Years / BMG Music UK (ASCAP) and Golden Touch MGMT Music (ASCAP) / Prescription Songs (ASCAP)

Personnel
 Banks – vocals
 BJ Burton – production, engineering, keyboards, synthesizers, drums, programming
 Francis Farewell Starlite – production, vocals, piano, table drums
 Tom Elmhirst – mixing
 Brandon Bost – engineering for mix
 Huntley Miller – mastering

Release history

References

2019 songs
2019 singles
Banks (singer) songs
Francis and the Lights songs
Harvest Records singles
Songs written by Banks (singer)
Songs written by BJ Burton